The Arusha Hotel is the oldest surviving hotel in the city of Arusha in Northern Tanzania. Previously, it was known as New Arusha Hotel. It was built in 1894.

References

External links

Buildings and structures in Arusha
Hotels established in 1894
Hotels in Tanzania